Rachel Hore (born 26 January 1960) is a British fiction writer, living in Norwich. After reading Modern History at St Catherine's College, Oxford, she worked at HarperCollins until moving to Norfolk with her husband, the author D. J. Taylor, and three children. She now teaches creative writing and publishing at the University of East Anglia. She is the author of eight novels, several of which have been Sunday Times Top Ten bestsellers.

Publications 
 The Dream House (2006)
 The Memory Garden (2007)
 The Glasspainter's Daughter (2009), shortlisted for The Romantic Novelists' Association Novel of the Year 2010.
 A Place of Secrets (2010)
 A Gathering Storm (2011), shortlisted for The Romantic Novelists' Association Historical Novel of the Year, 2012.
 The Silent Tide (2013)
 A Week In Paris (2014)
 The House on Bellevue Gardens (2016)
 Last Letter Home (2018)
 The Love Child (2019)
 A Beautiful Spy (2021)

References 

1960 births
21st-century English novelists
English women novelists
Living people
21st-century English women writers